Pecos Bill is a mythical American cowboy.

Pecos Bill may also refer to:
 Pecos Bill Tall Tale Inn and Cafe, a restaurant in Walt Disney World and Tokyo Disneyland 
 Pecos Bill (comics), an Italian comic series
 Pecos Bill (album), a 1988 album by Robin Williams
 Pecos Bill: The Greatest Cowboy of All Time, a 1937 novel by James Cloyd Bowman
 Pecos Bill, a segment of the 1948 animated feature Melody Time
 William Rufus Shafter (known by his nickname as "Pecos Bill"), a U.S. Army general